Polyadenylate-binding protein 2 (PABP-2) also known as polyadenylate-binding nuclear protein 1 (PABPN1) is a protein that in humans is encoded by the PABPN1 gene. PABN1 is a member of a larger family of poly(A)-binding proteins in the human genome.

Function 

This gene encodes an abundant nuclear protein that binds with high affinity to nascent poly(A) tails. The protein is required for progressive and efficient polymerization of poly(A) tails on the 3' ends of eukaryotic genes and controls the size of the poly(A) tail to about 250 nt. At steady-state, this protein is localized in the nucleus whereas a different poly(A) binding protein is localized in the cytoplasm. An expansion of the  trinucleotide (GCN) repeat from normal 10 to 11-17 at the 5' end of the coding region of this gene leads to autosomal dominant oculopharyngeal muscular dystrophy (OPMD) disease. Multiple splice variants have been described but their full-length nature is not known. One splice variant includes introns 1 and 6 but no protein is formed.

Interactions 
PABPN1 has been shown to interact with SNW1.

References

Further reading

External links 
  GeneReviews/NCBI/NIH/UW entry on Oculopharyngeal Muscular Dystrophy
 PDBe-KB provides an overview of all the structure information available in the PDB for Human Polyadenylate-binding protein 2